Figure skating was contested at the 1999 Winter Universiade. Skaters competed in the disciplines of men's singles, ladies' singles, pair skating, and ice dancing.

Results

Men

Ladies

Pairs

Ice dancing

External links
 results

1999
Winter Universiade
Winter Universiade
1999 Winter Universiade